1982 Emperor's Cup Final was the 62nd final of the Emperor's Cup competition. The final was played at National Stadium in Tokyo on January 1, 1983. Yamaha Motors won the championship.

Overview
Yamaha Motors won their 1st title, by defeating Fujita Industries 1–0.

Match details

See also
1982 Emperor's Cup

References

Emperor's Cup
1982 in Japanese football
Júbilo Iwata matches
Shonan Bellmare matches